Suely Franco (born 16 October 1939) is a Brazilian actress. She was born in Rio de Janeiro.
One of her most notable parts is the character Mimosa in O Cravo e a Rosa (2001).

Filmography

References

External links

1939 births
Living people
Actresses from Rio de Janeiro (city)
Brazilian television actresses
Brazilian telenovela actresses
Brazilian film actresses
20th-century Brazilian actresses
21st-century Brazilian actresses